Dreams of Love (Spanish: Sueño de amor) is a 1935 Mexican historical drama film directed by José Bohr and starring Claudio Arrau, Julieta Palavicini and Consuelo Frank. The film portrays the life of the composer Franz Liszt, in particular his relationship with George Sand.

Cast
 Claudio Arrau as Franz Liszt
 Julieta Palavicini as George Sand
 Consuelo Frank as Countess Marie D'Agoult
 Elena D'Orgaz as Carolina  
 Josefina Escobedo as Carolyne zu Sayn-Wittgenstein
 Carlos Villatoro as Alfred de Musset
 Manuel Buendía as Príncipe  
 Godofredo de Velasco as Comte d'Agoult
 Pilar Mata 
 Irene Obermayer 
 Carmen Conde

References

Bibliography 
 Toledo, Nelson. Patagonia Y Antartica, Personajes Históricos. Palibrio, 2011.

External links 
 

1935 films
1930s biographical drama films
1930s historical drama films
Mexican biographical drama films
Mexican historical drama films
1930s Spanish-language films
Films directed by José Bohr
Films set in France
Films set in the 19th century
Biographical films about musicians
Films about classical music and musicians
Films about composers
Films about pianos and pianists
Mexican black-and-white films
1935 drama films
1930s Mexican films